JDS Niyodo (DE-221) was the seventh ship of the s of Japan Maritime Self-Defense Force.

Development and design 
The main anti-submarine (ASW) weapon was changed from the M/50  ASW rocket launcher to the ASROC anti-submarine missile. The octuple launcher for ASROC was stationed at the mid-deck, and the entire ship design was prescribed by this stationing.

Construction and career
Niyodo was laid down on 20 September 1972 at Mitsui Engineering & SHipbuilding, Tamano and launched on 28 August 1973. The vessel was commissioned on 8 February 1974 into the 35th Escort Corps of the Ominato District Force.

On July 5, 1979, she was transferred to Yokosuka District Force 33rd Escort Corps, and the fixed port was transferred to Yokosuka.

Transferred to the 37th Escort Corps of the Yokosuka District Force on December 12, 1989.

On March 24, 1997, she was re-incorporated into the 33rd Yokosuka District Force Escort Corps.

On July 8, 1997, she was transferred to the 23rd Sasebo District Force Escort Corps, and the home port was transferred to Sasebo.

Removed from the register on June 24, 1999.

References

1973 ships
Ships built by Mitsui Engineering and Shipbuilding
Chikugo-class destroyer escorts